is an airport on Miyako-jima (Miyako Island) in Miyakojima, Okinawa, Japan.

History

The airport opened in 1943 as an Imperial Japanese Navy airbase. Civilian operations commenced in 1956. Jet service commenced in 1978 using Boeing 737s.

Japan Airlines provides nonstop service to Tokyo (Haneda Airport) operated by Japan Transocean Air.
All Nippon Airways commenced nonstop service to Tokyo (Haneda Airport) in 2016, using slots freed up by the cessation of Hokuriku region air services following the opening of the Hokuriku Shinkansen.

Facilities

Miyako Airport has a single three-story terminal building with five gates. The terminal includes four restaurants, a shopping promenade and an observation deck. The airport has parking berths for three mid-sized jet aircraft.

Airlines and destinations

Passenger

Statistics

See also
Naval Base Okinawa

References

External links

Miyako Airport
Miyako Airport Guide from Japan Airlines
 
 

Airports in Okinawa
Japan Self-Defense Forces